Namaklwe is a village near the Burma-Thai border in Mong Ton Township of Shan State in eastern Burma, across the border from Nong Uk, Thailand.  It lies along National Highway 45 which connects it to Mong Ton in the north, and  Chiang Mai may be accessed to the south. It has been a site of conflict when the Burma Frontier Force once gunned down Siamese invaders at Namaklwe.

References

External links
Maplandia World Gazetteer

Populated places in Mongsat District
Mong Ton Township
Myanmar–Thailand border crossings